The following is a list of notable deaths in December 2006.

Entries for each day are listed alphabetically by surname. A typical entry lists information in the following sequence:
 Name, age, country of citizenship at birth, subsequent country of citizenship (if applicable), reason for notability, cause of death (if known), and reference.

December 2006

1
Claude Jade, 58, French actress (Baisers Volés, L'Amour en Fuite, Topaz), metastatic eye cancer.
Herbert Gursky, 76, American astrophysicist for the Naval Research Laboratory, stomach cancer.
Geoffrey Colin Guy, 86, British airman and colonial governor.
Sid Raymond, 97, American character actor and voice of Baby Huey, complications of a stroke.
Ali Khan Samsudin, 48, Malaysian "snake king", venomous snakebite.

2
Bob Berry, 80, British test cricket player, natural causes.
Corinne Clark, 83, American baseball player (All-American Girls Professional Baseball League).
Kari Edwards, 52, American poet, artist and gender activist, heart failure.
Kurt Lipstein, 97, German-born legal scholar.
Dave Mount, 59, British drummer for glam rock band Mud, heart attack.
Mariska Veres, 59, Dutch singer for Shocking Blue (Venus), cancer.

3
Craig Hinton, 42, British science fiction author, heart attack.
Logan Whitehurst, 29, American singer and songwriter (The Velvet Teen), brain cancer.

4
Sir Peter Gadsden, 77, British Lord Mayor of London (1979–1980).
Joseph Ki-Zerbo, 84, Burkinabé politician, natural causes. (French)
James Kim, 35, American CNET editor, exposure and hypothermia.
Rodney Needham, 83, British social anthropologist.
Len Sutton, 81, American Indianapolis 500 racing driver, cancer.
Adam Williams, 82, American actor, lymphoma.

5
 David Bronstein, 82, Ukrainian chess grandmaster and writer, champion of USSR, natural causes.
 Eric Cox, 83, Australian rugby league player, referee and administrator, pneumonia and stroke.
Michael Gilden, 44, American actor (NCIS, Return of the Jedi), apparent suicide.
 Gerry Humphreys, 75, Welsh sound engineer.
 Gernot Jurtin, 51, Austrian football player, cancer.
Timothy Moxon, 82, British actor and entrepreneur.
 Van Smith, 61, American costume and makeup designer, heart attack.

6
Han Ahmedow, 70, Turkmen Prime Minister (1989–1992), heart attack.
 Darren Brown, 44, British musician and lead singer (Mega City Four), stroke.
Russell Buchanan, 106, American World War I veteran, stroke.
 Hugo Cores, 69, Uruguayan historian, labor leader and politician, Deputy (1990–1994), stroke.
Samuel Devons, 92, British physicist and science historian at Columbia University, heart failure.
Andra Franklin, 47, American football player (Miami Dolphins), heart failure.
Mavis Pugh, 92, British actress (You Rang, M'Lord?), natural causes.
Robert Rosenblum, 79, American art historian, curator, and author, colon cancer.
William Salcer, 82, Czechoslovakian-born American inventor and Holocaust survivor, leukemia.

7
Lyuben Berov, 81, Bulgarian prime minister (1992–1994), cancer.
Kevin Berry, 61, Australian gold medal winner in the 200m butterfly at the 1964 Summer Olympics, brain tumour.
Desmond Briscoe, 81, British sound engineer and founder of the BBC Radiophonic Workshop, natural causes.
Moses Hardy, 112, American supercentenarian, oldest known American man, last African American World War I veteran, natural causes.
J. B. Hunt, 79, American trucking executive, founder of J.B. Hunt Transport Services, head injuries from a fall.
Kim Hyung-chil, 47, South Korean equestrian at the 2006 Asian Games, crushed by falling horse.
Jeane Kirkpatrick, 80, American United Nations ambassador (1981–1985), heart failure.
Chris Nelson, 46, American photographer, heart attack.
Jay McShann, 90, American blues and swing pianist, bandleader and singer, natural causes.

8
William H. Briare, 76, American politician, Mayor of Las Vegas (1975–1987).
Sir Colin Figures, 81, British head of the Secret Intelligence Service (1982–1985), natural causes.
Martha Tilton, 91, American jazz and swing singer with Benny Goodman, natural causes.
Philip Tower, 89, British army general.
José Uribe, 47, Dominican baseball shortstop (1984–1993), car accident.

9
Koula Agagiotou, 91, Greek actress (To Retire), natural causes.
Peter Derow, 62, American classical scholar, heart attack.
Georgia Gibbs, 87, American singer ("Kiss of Fire") known for her work on Your Hit Parade, leukemia.
Ralph Gomberg, 85, American principal oboist at the Boston Symphony, primary lateral sclerosis.
Andrei Lomakin, 42, Russian ice hockey player, gold medallist at 1988 Winter Olympics, long illness (cancer).
Martin Nodell, 91, American comic book and advertising artist, creator of the Golden Age Green Lantern, natural causes.
Tremayne Rodd, 3rd Baron Rennell, 71, British rugby union player for Scotland, cancer.

10
Mario Llerena, 93, Cuban intellectual, author and former Castro supporter turned critic, natural causes.
Salvatore Pappalardo, 88, Italian Archbishop of Palermo (1970–1996), natural causes.
Augusto Pinochet, 91, Chilean president (1973–1990), complications from heart attack.
David Wood, 43, American environmental campaigner.

11
Elizabeth Bolden, 116, American oldest verified person in the world (2006), natural causes.
Kenneth Cummins, 106, British veteran of the First World War, natural causes.
Tom Gregory, 79, American television news anchor and announcer, heart disease.
Homer Ledford, 79, American bluegrass musician, guitar and dulcimer luthier, Lou Gehrig's disease and stroke.
Lo Tak-shing, 71, Hong Kong politician, heart attack.
Colin Mair, 86, British rector of Kelvinside Academy.
Walter Ward, 66, American lead singer of The Olympics, unspecified illness.

12
Paul Arizin, 78, American basketball player (Philadelphia Warriors).
Peter Boyle, 71, American actor (Young Frankenstein, Everybody Loves Raymond), multiple myeloma.
Kenny Davern, 71, American jazz clarinetist, heart attack.
Cor van der Hart, 78, Dutch footballer, natural causes.
Oscar Klein, 76, Austrian-born jazz trumpeter, heart attack.
Antoine Raab, 93, German association footballer and anti-fascist, natural causes. (French)
Eliyathamby Ratnasabapathy, 68, Sri Lankan Tamil militant civil war leader, long illness.
Ellis Rubin, 81, American attorney and author, cancer.
Raymond P. Shafer, 89, American Governor of Pennsylvania (1967–1971), complications from heart failure.
Alan Shugart, 76, American disk drive pioneer, co-founder of Seagate Technology, complications from heart surgery.
Charles Stourton, 26th Baron Mowbray, 83, British Conservative whip in the House of Lords, pneumonia.

13
Henry Beachell, 100, American agriculturalist and recipient of the 1996 World Food Prize.
Eileen Caddy, 89, British co-founder of the Findhorn Foundation, natural causes.
Richard Carlson, 45, American author (Don't Sweat the Small Stuff), heart attack.
Loyola de Palacio, 56, Spanish Vice-President of the European Commission, cancer.
Alf Delany, 95, Irish Olympic sailor 
Ángel Nieves Díaz, 55, Puerto Rican murderer, lethal injection.
Homesick James, 96, American blues musician, natural causes.
Lamar Hunt, 74, American owner of Kansas City Chiefs, coiner of term "Super Bowl", complications of prostate cancer.
Bernard Kleiman, 78, American general counsel to the United Steelworkers of America, heart attack.
Charles Peter McColough, 84, Canadian CEO of Xerox Corporation, cardiac arrest.
Mario Ravagnan, 75, Italian Olympic fencer.

14
Anton Balasingham, 69, Sri Lankan LTTE senior negotiator, cholangiocarcinoma.
John Bridge, 91, British recipient of the George Cross and George Medal, natural causes.
Camille Darsières, 74, French politician deputy for Martinique's 3rd constituency (1993–2002).
Ahmet Ertegün, 83, American businessman, co-founder of Atlantic Records, head injury from a fall at a Rolling Stones concert.
Michael Jonas Evans, 57, American actor (The Jeffersons), throat cancer.
Kate Fleming, 41, American actress, audio book producer and narrator, drowned.
John Hamilton, 84, British politician, leader of Liverpool City Council (1983–1986), lung disease.
Robert Long, 63, Dutch singer, cancer. 
Sivuca, 76, Brazilian accordionist and composer, cancer.

15
Federico Crescentini, 24, San Marino footballer, drowned.
Frank Johnson, 63, British journalist, editor of The Spectator (1995–1999), cancer.
Clay Regazzoni, 67, Swiss Formula One racing driver (1970–1980), car accident.
Mary Stolz, 86, American young adult novelist (Belling the Tiger, The Noonday Friends), natural causes.
Matt Zunic, 87, American basketball player and coach.

16
Don Jardine, 66, Canadian professional wrestler, heart attack and leukemia.
Chicho Jesurun, 59, Dutch baseball player and coach from the Netherlands Antilles, heart attack.
Oginohana Masaaki, 71, Japanese sumo wrestler.
Goce Nikolovski, 59, Macedonian singer, suicide.
Taliep Petersen, South African theatre impresario, shot.
John Rae, 75, British educator and writer, headmaster of Westminster School (1970–1986).
Pnina Salzman, 84, Israeli pianist, natural causes.
Cecil Travis, 93, American baseball player (Washington Senators), natural causes.
Larry Zox, 69, American artist, cancer.

17
Timmie Rogers, 91, American comedian, singer-songwriter, bandleader and actor.
Joe Gill, 87, American comic book writer.
Kyōko Kishida, 76, Japanese actress, respiratory failure caused by brain tumor.
Esko Nikkari, 68, Finnish actor, pneumonia.
Larry Sherry, 71, American baseball player (Los Angeles Dodgers), MVP of the 1959 World Series, cancer.

18
Abdul Amir al-Jamri, 67, Bahraini Shiite Muslim cleric, heart failure and kidney failure.
Joseph Barbera, 95, American cartoonist, co-founder of Hanna-Barbera Productions, natural causes.
Ruth Bernhard, 101, American photographer, natural causes.
W. Craig Broadwater, 56, American judge, cancer.
Denis Carter, Baron Carter, 74, British politician, Chief Whip in the House of Lords (1997–2002), cancer.
Mike Dickin, 63, British talkSPORT radio presenter, car accident.
Mavor Moore, 87, Canadian writer, actor, radio and television producer, illness.
Mollie Orshansky, 91, American statistician and economist, cardiac arrest.
Daniel Pinkham, 83, American composer, natural causes.

19
Len Ablett, 90, Australian rules football player.
Jack Burnley, 95, American cartoonist and illustrator, natural causes.
Oonah McFee, 90, Canadian writer.
Maj-Britt Nilsson, 82, Swedish actress (Summer Interlude, Secrets of Women).
Akhtar Mohammad Osmani, Afghan Taliban commander, airstrike.
Elisabeth Rivers-Bulkeley, 82, Austrian-born British first female member of the London Stock Exchange.
Roy Ward, 83, Australian politician.

20
Yukio Aoshima, 74, Japanese comedian, Governor of Tokyo (1995–1999), myelodysplastic syndrome.
John Bishop, 77, American screenwriter and playwright.
Elkan Blout, 87, American biochemist (Harvard University and the Polaroid Corporation), pneumonia.
Anne Rogers Clark, 77, American dog show judge (Westminster Kennel Club Dog Show), kidney failure associated with colon cancer.
Ma Ji, 72, Chinese xiangsheng actor, heart attack.
Mick Mulligan, 78, British jazz trumpeter and bandleader.
Tadayuki Nakashima, 35, Japanese comedian, member of duo Cunning, pneumonia and complications from leukemia.
Piergiorgio Welby, 60, Italian poet and euthanasia advocate, removal of life support.

21
Scobie Breasley, 92, Australian jockey, stroke.
Rogério Oliveira da Costa, 30, Brazilian-born Macedonian football player, heart attack.
Lois Hall, 80, American actress, heart attack and stroke.
Jerzy Janikowski, 54, Polish Olympic fencer.
Pierre Louki, 86, French actor and singer-songwriter.
Saparmurat Niyazov, 66, Turkmen Communist party secretary (1985–1991), president (1990–2006), cardiac arrest.
Philippa Pearce, 86, British children's author, stroke.
Karl Strauss, 94, German-born brewer for Pabst and Karl Strauss Brewing Company, natural causes.
Sydney Wooderson, 92, British lawyer and track athlete, world record holder for mile run (1937–1942), kidney failure.

22
Richard Boston, 67, British journalist and author, illness.
Sam Chapman, 90, American athlete, Alzheimer's disease.
Ervin Lázár, 70, Hungarian writer, Kossuth Prize winner, lung failure.
Dennis Linde, 63, American songwriter ("Burning Love", "Goodbye Earl"), idiopathic pulmonary fibrosis.
Michael Morrison, 60, American pornographic actor.
Elena Mukhina, 46, Russian gymnast, complications of quadriplegia.
Terence O'Brien, 85, British diplomat, ambassador to Nepal, Burma and Indonesia.
Phillip Pine, 86, American actor.
Thomas Shoyama, 90, Canadian politician, heart failure and Parkinson's disease.
Galina Ustvolskaya, 87, Russian composer, natural causes.

23
Sol Carter, 98, American baseball player.
Charlie Drake, 81, British comedian, actor and singer (My Boomerang Won't Come Back), stroke-related illness.
Wilma Dykeman, 86, American author and journalist, complications after hip fracture.
Dutch Mason, 68, Canadian blues musician, complications from diabetes.
Bo Mya, 79, Burmese rebel leader, complications of heart disease and diabetes.
Rosina Raisbeck, 90, Australian soprano singer.
Robert Stafford, 93, American politician, governor of Vermont (1959–1961) and senator (1971–1989), natural causes.
Timothy J. Tobias, 54, American composer and musician.
Marilyn Waltz, 75, American actress and Playboy model.

24
Braguinha, 99, Brazilian composer, multiple organ failure.
Kenneth Sivertsen, 45, Norwegian folk singer, comedian and poet, brain trauma.
Frank Stanton, 98, American president of CBS (1946–1971).

25
James Brown, 73, American soul singer and bandleader, heart failure related to pneumonia.
John Butcher, 60, British Conservative MP (1979–1997), heart attack.
Sir Bob Cotton, 91, Australian politician and ambassador to the United States (1982–1985, 1991–1994).
Sven Lindberg, 88, Swedish actor.
Ingerid Vardund, 79, Norwegian actress.

26
Robert Boehm, 92, American lawyer and chairman of the Center for Constitutional Rights.
Sir Harold Bollers, 91, Guyanese jurist, Chief Justice.
Chris Brown, 45, American baseball player, complications from burns.
Bill DeArango, 84, American jazz guitarist.
Gerald Ford, 93, American politician, President (1974–1977), Vice President (1973–1974), arteriosclerotic cerebrovascular disease and diffuse arteriosclerosis.
Ivar Formo, 55, Norwegian cross-country skier and Olympic Games champion, drowning.
John Heath-Stubbs, 88, British poet and translator, lung cancer.
Martin David Kruskal, 81, American mathematician (Princeton University), stroke.
Fernand Nault, 85, Canadian ballet dancer and artistic director, Parkinson's disease.
George Snell, 99, Canadian Anglican prelate, Bishop of Toronto (1966–1972).

27
Richard Dean, 50, American model, photographer and television host (Cover Shot), pancreatic cancer.
Pierre Delanoë, 88, French lyricist, cardiac arrest.
Scotty Glacken, 62, American Georgetown University football coach (1970–1992).
Itche Goldberg, 102, Polish-born American writer and Yiddish language preservationist.
Marmaduke Hussey, Baron Hussey of North Bradley, 83, British media executive, chair of BBC Board of Governors (1986–1996).
Tommy Sandlin, 62, Swedish ice hockey coach.

28
Gracie Cole, 82, British trumpeter and bandleader.
Nicola Granieri, 64, Italian Olympic fencer.
Jamal Karimi-Rad, 50, Iranian Minister of Justice, car accident.
Mandy Mitchell-Innes, 92, British oldest living test cricketer for England, natural causes.
Jack Myers, 93, American biologist and science contributing editor (Highlights for Children), bladder cancer.
Jared Nathan, 21, American actor (ZOOM), car accident.
Gershon Shaked, 77, Israeli author and professor of Hebrew Literature.
Aroldo Tieri, 89, Italian actor.

29
Harald Bredesen, 88, American Lutheran pastor and advocate of speaking in tongues, injuries following a fall.
Bud Delp, 74, American racehorse trainer inducted into the Thoroughbred Racing Hall of Fame, cancer.
Johnny Gibson, 101, American 400 meter hurdles world record holder (1927–1928).
Charles Addo Odametey, 69, Ghanaian football player.
Red Wolf, 18, American world champion bucking bull.
Charlie Tyra, 71, American basketball player, heart failure.

30
Frank Campanella, 87, American character actor.
Mitzi Cunliffe, 88, American sculptor.
Elizabeth Greenhill (bookbinder), 99, English bookbinder
Saddam Hussein, 69, Iraqi President (1979–2003), execution by hanging.
Antony Lambton, 84, British Conservative government minister.
Donald Murray, 82, American columnist.
Azumi Muto, 20, Japanese model and actress, homicide.
Michel Plasse, 58, Canadian ice hockey player, cardiac arrest.
Gerald Washington, 57, American mayor-elect of Westlake, Louisiana, suicide by gunshot.

31
Marv Breeding, 72, American Major League Baseball player (Orioles, Dodgers).
John Denison, 95, British music administrator.
James Harder, 80, American civil engineer.
Lida Hensley, 81, American president of Universal Life Church.
Ya'akov Hodorov, 79, Israeli football goalkeeper, stroke.
Seymour Martin Lipset, 84, American sociologist, stroke.
Liese Prokop, 65, Austrian athlete and Minister of the Interior (2004–2006), aortic dissection.
Joe Walton, 81, English football player (Preston North End).

References

2006-12
 12